Soul Sauce is an album by Latin jazz vibraphonist Cal Tjader recorded in late 1964 and released on the Verve label.

Reception

The Allmusic review by Stephen Cook awarded the album 4½ stars, stating: "Soul Sauce is one of the highlights from Tjader's catalog with its appealing mixture of mambo, samba, bolero, and boogaloo styles... an album full of smart arrangements, subtly provocative vibe solos, and intricate percussion backing."

Track listing
 "Soul Sauce (Guachi Guaro)" (Dizzy Gillespie, Chano Pozo) - 2:24
 "Afro Blue" (Mongo Santamaría) - 4:27
 "Pantano" (Lonnie Hewitt) - 3:35
 "Somewhere in the Night" (Billy May, Milt Raskin) - 3:14
 "Maramoor Mambo" (Armando Peraza) - 4:00
 "Tanya" (Hewitt) - 5:28
 "Leyte" (Lonnie Hewitt, Cal Tjader) - 5:18
 "Spring Is Here" (Lorenz Hart, Richard Rodgers) - 4:00
 "João" (Clare Fischer) - 4:50
 "Soul Sauce (Guachi Guaro)" [rough mix] (Gillespie, Pozo) - 2:30 Bonus track on CD reissue   
 "Monkey Beams" (Gary McFarland) - 5:40 Bonus track on CD reissue  
 "Ming" (Composer Unknown) - 8:39 Bonus track on CD reissue  
 "Mamblues" (Cal Tjader) - 3:49 Bonus track on CD reissue    
Recorded at Van Gelder Studio in Englewood Cliffs, NJ on November 19 (track 2), at A & R Studios in New York City on November 20 (tracks 1, 3-10 & 13), and in New York City on November 23 (tracks 11 & 12), 1964

Personnel
Cal Tjader - vibraphone
Lonnie Hewitt - piano
Richard Davis (track 2), John Hilliard (tracks 1, 3-10 & 13) - bass
Grady Tate (tracks 2, 11 & 12), Johnny Rae (tracks 1, 3-10 & 13) - drums
Willie Bobo, Armando Peraza, Alberto Valdes - percussion
Donald Byrd - trumpet (tracks 2, 11 & 12) 
Jimmy Heath - tenor saxophone (tracks 2, 11 & 12) 
Kenny Burrell - guitar (tracks 2, 11 & 12) 
Bob Bushnell - electric bass (tracks 11 & 12)

References

Verve Records albums
Cal Tjader albums
1965 albums
Albums produced by Creed Taylor
Albums recorded at Van Gelder Studio